Dale Whitnell (born 9 August 1988) is an English professional golfer who plays on the European Tour. He won the 2019 KPMG Trophy on the Challenge Tour.

Amateur career
Whitnell had a successful amateur career and he won the 2006 Abu Dhabi Junior Golf Championship. In 2008, he won the St Andrews Trophy and played in the Eisenhower Trophy with Luke Goddard and Sam Hutsby. In 2009, he was tapped to play in the Walker Cup team. He won silver at the European Amateur Team Championship both in 2008 and 2009.

Professional career
Whitnell was ranked Number One amateur in England in 2009 and won the English Golf Union Order of Merit convincingly. He was part of Great Britain and Ireland's 2009 Walker Cup side but it took him 11 years to earn a full European Tour card after turning professional in 2009. 

He came through local qualifying to play in the 2012 Open Championship and made the cut.

Whitnell has finished tied 4th on the European Tour three times, at the 2009 Alfred Dunhill Championship, the 2020 Betfred British Masters, and the 2021 Dubai Duty Free Irish Open. Whitnell shared the lead heading into the weekend at the 2021 Cazoo Classic after two opening rounds of 68, but two final rounds of 72 saw him finish in a tie for 13th.

Amateur wins
2006 Abu Dhabi Junior Golf Championship
2009 Portuguese Amateur, Tillman Trophy

Professional wins (9)

Challenge Tour wins (1)

Challenge Tour playoff record (1–0)

Jamega Pro Golf Tour wins (8)

Results in major championships

"T" = Tied
Note: Whitnell only played in The Open Championship.

Team appearances
Amateur
European Boys' Team Championship (representing England): 2006
St Andrews Trophy (representing Great Britain & Ireland): 2008
Eisenhower Trophy (representing England): 2008
European Amateur Team Championship (representing England): 2008, 2009
Walker Cup (representing Great Britain & Ireland): 2009

See also
2019 European Tour Qualifying School graduates

References

External links

English male golfers
European Tour golfers
Sportspeople from Colchester
1988 births
Living people